The 1951 Maine Black Bears football team was an American football team that represented the University of Maine as a member of the Yankee Conference during the 1951 college football season. In its first season under head coach Harold Westerman, the team compiled a 6–0–1 record (3–0–1 against conference opponents) and won the Yankee Conference championship. The team played its home games at Alumni Field in Orono, Maine. Peter Pocius Jr. was the team captain.

Schedule

References

Maine
Maine Black Bears football seasons
Yankee Conference football champion seasons
College football undefeated seasons
Maine Black Bears football